Meduza is a Russian online newspaper based in Latvia.

Meduza may also refer to:
 Meduza (Russian folklore), a mythical creature
 Meduza (producers), a team of Italian record producers
 Meduza Island, Antarctica
 Eddie Meduza (born Errol Leonard Norstedt, 1948–2002), Swedish composer and musician

See also
 Medusa (disambiguation)